The Sir George Stokes Award (colloquially the Stokes Medal) is named after George Gabriel Stokes and is awarded biennially by the Analytical Division of the Royal Society of Chemistry.  It was established in 1999 to recognize the multidisciplinary nature of analytical chemistry and is given:

There is no restriction on the nationality of those who can be considered for the award.

Winners 
Source: Royal Society of Chemistry

See also

 List of chemistry awards

References 

Awards of the Royal Society of Chemistry
Awards established in 1999
1999 establishments in the United Kingdom